Elections to Brentwood Borough Council were held on 1 May 2008.  One third of the council was up for election and the Conservative Party kept overall control of the council.

The Conservatives remained dominant on the council gaining seats from the Liberal Democrats and the Labour Party. However they also lost seats to the Liberal Democrats and to an independent candidate, who became the only independent councillor on the council.

After the election, the composition of the council was
Conservative 28
Liberal Democrat 6
Labour 2
Independent 1

Election result

Ward results

References

2008 Brentwood election result
Ward results

2008
2008 English local elections
2000s in Essex